Koelman is a surname. Notable people with the surname include:

 Rudolf Koelman (born 1959), Dutch violinist
 Jan Philip Koelman (1818-1893), Dutch painter

Dutch-language surnames